The Béli River is a seasonal river of northern Burkina Faso, just south of the Malian border. It is a western tributary of the Niger River, the confluence is near Ayourou.

Rivers of Burkina Faso